UPP may stand for:

Political parties
Unión por el Perú, a liberal or centrist political party in Peru
Union for Promoting Progress (União Promotora para o Progresso), a political party in Macao
United People's Party (disambiguation), various parties
United Progressive Party (disambiguation), various parties
Unified Progressive Party, a political party in South Korea

Other
Pacifying Police Unit, policing and law enforcement program in Rio de Janeiro
Ultimate++, an open source IDE and easy-to-use Widget toolkit
Ultimate Picture Palace, a cinema in Oxford, England
United Plankton Pictures, a production company
Universal Pricing Policy, see Price_discrimination#Universal_pricing
University Partnership Programme, an accommodation business for students in the UK
University Partnership Program, a collaboration relationship between (usually US) universities and other organizations
University of Pittsburgh Press
The IATA code for Upolu Airport in Hawaii
Uppsala, especially in seismology
 Universal Power Plant, a unitised engine installation devised by Rolls-Royce
 United Plankton Pictures

See also
Upp (disambiguation)